Upper Eddington is a hamlet in Berkshire, England, and part of the civil parish of Hungerford .

Hamlets in Berkshire
West Berkshire District